First Gold (1993–2011) was a National Hunt racehorse that was trained by François Doumen.

The horse won the 2000 King George VI Chase race by a distance of 10 lengths when ridden by Thierry Doumen, beating Florida Pearl into second place. At the time of the win the horse was owned by the Marquesa de Moratalla.

After his King George VI success he was purchased by J. P. McManus, following which the horse won the Punchestown Gold Cup and the Martell Cognac Cup.

The horse was put down in January 2011 after suffering with laminitis.

References

External links
Racing career at goracing.ie

1993 racehorse births
2011 racehorse deaths
National Hunt racehorses
Racehorses trained in France
Racehorses bred in France